John Johnson was an Arctic explorer and World War II veteran. 

Johnson server as cook and mechanic for the MacGregor Arctic Expedition (1937–1938).

He was killed while on active duty during World War II.

References
Inglis, Robert A Scout Goes North, 1938
MacGregor, Cliffort J. Monthly Weather Review, October 1939
"World War II Honor List of Dead and Missing Army and Army Air Forces Personnel, State of New Jersey" National Archive, June 1946
Sallach, David L. NJ Historical Commission Newsletter, February 1977
Vogel, Hal Ice Cap News, Nov-Dec 1977
Vogel, Hal They Brought Their Own Storms, 1977

Year of birth missing
Year of death missing
Explorers of the Arctic